Arroz con leche is a 1950 Argentinian romantic comedy film directed and written by Carlos Schlieper with Julio Porter based on the play by Carlos Notti, "Noche en Viena".  The film premiered on October 5, 1950, in Buenos Aires and was rated PG 14.

Cast
 Perla Achával
 Héctor Calcaño
 Susana Campos
 Perla Cristal
 Virginia de la Cruz
 Lía Durán
 Carlos Enríquez
 Lalo Hartich
 Eliseo Herrero
 Adolfo Linvel
 Ángel Magaña
 Arsenio Perdiguero
 Mario Perelli
 María Esther Podestá
 Hilda Rey
 Nélida Romero
 Esteban Serrador
 Amelia Vargas
 Wanda Were
 Malisa Zini

References

External links
 

1950 films
1950s Spanish-language films
Films directed by Carlos Schlieper
1950 romantic comedy films
Argentine romantic comedy films
Argentine black-and-white films
1950s Argentine films